Jason R. Pinkston (born September 5, 1987) is a former American football offensive guard, who played his entire career for the Cleveland Browns of the National Football League (NFL). He is also the cousin of Todd Pinkston, a former NFL wide receiver.

Collegiate career
During his junior year at the University of Pittsburgh season in 2009, Pinkston was named first-team All-Big East and a second-team All-American by SI.com and Rivals.com. During his senior season in 2010, he was named to the Lombardi Award and Outland Trophy watch lists.  As a 2011 NFL draft prospect, Pinkston was considered one of the best offensive linemen in the 2010 senior class.

Professional career
Pinkston was selected in the fifth round (150th overall) of the 2011 NFL Draft by the Cleveland Browns. Pinkston started all 16 games for the Cleveland Browns as a rookie after guard Eric Steinbach was injured in training camp. Pinkston started the 2012 season as the Browns starting left guard, but was injured during the regular season and was found to have a blood clot in his lung, the Browns placed him on injured reserve. He reached an injury settlement with the Browns on August 5, 2014, stating his intention to retire because of recent health issues.

References

External links
Pittsburgh Panthers bio

1987 births
Living people
Players of American football from Pittsburgh
American football offensive tackles
American football offensive guards
Pittsburgh Panthers football players
Cleveland Browns players